Borsonia jaya is a species of sea snail, a marine gastropod mollusk in the family Borsoniidae.

Description
The size of the shell attains 70 mm.

Distribution
This marine species occurs in the Arafura Sea at depths between 676 m and 1084 m.

References

 Sysoev (1997) Check·list of deep-water turrid gastropods from Indonesia p. 331

External links
 MNHN, Paris: Borsonia jaya (holotype)

jaya
Gastropods described in 1997